Brisaster townsendi is a species of sea urchins of the family Schizasteridae. Their armour is covered with spines. Brisaster townsendi was first scientifically described in 1898 by Alexander Emanuel Agassiz.

References 

townsendi